The  series is a Japanese manga series written and illustrated Mei Sakuraga. It is serialized in the monthly  manga magazine Hanaoto and the quarterly magazine Boys Kyapi! since 2006.

Plot

Towa Aikawa is a high school delinquent who opposes the student council. He develops a friendship with Mikado Shirahane, but unbeknownst to him, Mikado has two secrets: the first one being that he is the president of the student council, and the second one being that he is in love with Towa.

Characters

Main characters

Towa is a first-year high school delinquent who opposes the student council.

Mikado is a second-year high school student and the president of the student council.

Classmates

Shinonome is Towa's friend and a first-year high school student.

Yu is Towa's friend and a first-year high school student.

Yukimura is a second-year high school student and the vice president of the student council.

Kosaka is a first-year high school student and a member of the disciplinary committee.

Akagi is a third-year high school student and the head of the disciplinary committee.

Hayate is Kosaka's younger brother.

Family members

Nagahisa is Towa's eldest brother, who is protective of him.

Kuon is Towa's second oldest brother, who is protective of him. He is a second-year college student.

Nanao is Mikado's older brother. He is a third-year college student attending the same university as Kuon.

Media

Manga

I Want to Be Naughty is written and illustrated by Mei Sakuraga. It was serialized in monthly manga magazine Hanaoto since 2006. The chapters were later released in 14 bound volumes by Houbunsha under the Hanaoto Comics imprint.

Throughout the series' run, several side stories focusing on side characters were also published. The Janai Kedo series focuses on Shinonome and Yukimura, Towa and Mikado's friends. The Mujihi na series focuses on Kuon and Nanao, Towa and Mikado's older brothers, and was serialized in the quarterly magazine Boys Kyapi! Beginning with Himitsu Janai Kedo: Yukimura Shūji ni Tsuite no Kansatsu, the series moved to Boys Kyapi!

In June 2007, Media Blasters licensed the first volume for North American distribution in English under their Kitty Media imprint.

Side stories

The short comic Warui Koto Bakka Shite Gomen Nasai was originally released in 2008 as a limited edition booklet acquired through a lottery with purchase of Kirai Janai Kedo. It was later re-released and compiled with Sakuraga's other short comics on June 19, 2020 on digital platforms.

Drama CDs

Several drama CDs produced by Movic were released during the series' run. I Want to Be Naughty was released on December 21, 2007. Kirai Janai Kedo was released on January 27, 2010 and peaked at #264 on the Oricon Weekly Albums Chart. Warui Ko Demo Ii? was released on July 22, 2010. Koi Janai Kedo was released on August 25, 2010. Mujihi na Otoko was released on May 25, 2011 and peaked at #207 on the Oricon Weekly Albums Chart. Warui Yatsu Demo Ii was released on March 2, 2012. Warui Koibito ja Dame? was released on March 21, 2012. Kare Janai Kedo was released on April 2, 2012 and peaked at #221 on the Oricon Weekly Albums Chart. Mujihi na Anata was released on June 28, 2013 and peaked at #96 on the Oricon Weekly Albums Chart. Sunao Janai Kedo was released on November 29, 2013 and peaked at #159 on the Oricon Weekly Albums Chart. Warui Ōji Demo Suki was released on October 30, 2015 and peaked at #113 on the Oricon Weekly Albums Chart. Mujihi na Karada was released on November 27, 2015 and peaked at #120 on the Oricon Weekly Albums Chart. Shōwaru Ōkami ga Koi o Shitarashii was released on December 25, 2015 and peaked at #94 on the Oricon Weekly Albums Chart. Himitsu Janai Kedo: Yukimura Shūji ni Tsuite no Kansatsu was released on November 25, 2016 and peaked at #152 on the Oricon Weekly Albums Chart.

Reception

The I Want to Be Naughty series placed at #20 in the Top 20 Manga on Chil Chil'''s Boys Love Awards in 2014. Kare Janai Kedo peaked at #27 on Oricon and sold 31,321 physical copies on its first week of sales. Mujihi na Anata peaked at #43 on Oricon and sold 20,759 physical copies on its second week of sales, with a cumulative total of 37,488 physical copies. Sunao Janai Kedo peaked at #26 on Oricon and sold 31,415 physical copies on its first week of sales. Mujihi na Karada peaked at #21 on Oricon and sold 34,527 physical copies on its first week of sales. Shōwaru Ōkami ga Koi o Shitarashii peaked at #25 on Oricon and sold 32,966 physical copies on its first week of sales, with a cumulative total of 33,275 physical copies. Himitsu Janai Kedo: Yukimura Shūji ni Tsuite no Kansatsu'' peaked at #36 on Oricon and sold 22,183 physical copies on its second week of sales, with a cumulative total of 36,390 physical copies.

References

External links
 

Japanese radio dramas
Kitty Media
LGBT in anime and manga
Yaoi anime and manga
2000s LGBT literature